Kasel-Golzig (Lower Sorbian: Kózłow-Gólsk) is a municipality in the district of Dahme-Spreewald in Brandenburg in Germany.

Demography

References

Localities in Dahme-Spreewald